Kavango–Zambezi Transfrontier Conservation Area (KAZA TFCA) is the second-largest nature and landscape conservation area in the world, spanning the international borders of five countries in Southern Africa. It includes a major part of the Upper Zambezi River and Okavango basins and Delta, the Caprivi Strip of Namibia, the southeastern part of Angola, southwestern Zambia, the northern wildlands of Botswana and western Zimbabwe. The centre of this area is at the confluence of the Zambezi and Chobe Rivers where the borders of Botswana, Namibia, Zambia and Zimbabwe meet. It incorporates a number of notable national parks and nature sites, including Chobe National Park, Hwange National Park, and the Victoria Falls. The region is home to a population of approximately 250,000 animals, including the largest population of African Elephants in the world.

History
The idea was initiated by the Peace Parks Foundation and the World Wide Fund for Nature. It was inspired by the Okavango–Upper Zambezi International Tourism Initiative and the Four Corners Transboundary Natural Resource Management. In 2003 the ministers responsible for tourism in Angola, Botswana, Namibia, Zambia and Zimbabwe met in Katima Mulilo, Namibia about the project. In 2006 the Southern African Development Community (SADC) endorsed the KAZA TFCA as a SADC project, and later in 2006 the five partner countries signed a memorandum of understanding at Victoria Falls, Zimbabwe. The establishment of the area was confirmed on August 18, 2011 through a treaty signed by the heads of government of the five participating countries. The official opening of the area occurred on March 15, 2012 in Katima Mulilo.

Financial support comes from a variety of sources. These include KfW Development bank, the German government, the World Bank, the Netherlands, and Sweden.

Lions were studied throughout the area in 2014. In November 2014, the governments of Zambia and Zimbabwe introduced a common KAZA visa, allowing holders to move freely across borders within the conservation area.

Components

The Kavango–Zambezi Transfrontier Conservation Area has an area of 520,000 km². Of this land, 17% is in Angola, 30% in Botswana, 14% in Namibia, 25% in Zambia, and 14% in Zimbabwe.

287,132 km² of the included land consists of pre-existing protected areas. The incorporated protected areas are:

in Zambia:
 Kafue National Park
 Liuwa Plain National Park
 Mosi-oa-Tunya National Park
 Sioma Ngwezi National Park
 Lower Zambezi National Park
in Namibia:
 Bwabwata National Park
 Khaudum National Park
 Mangetti National Park
 Mudumu National Park
 Nkasa Rupara National Park
in Botswana:
 Chobe National Park
 Makgadikgadi Pan
 Nxai Pan National Park
 Moremi Game Reserve
in Zimbabwe:
 Chizarira National Park
 Hwange National Park
 Kazuma Pan National Park
 Mana Pools National Park
 Matusadona National Park
 Victoria Falls National Park
 Zambezi National Park
in Angola:
 Luengue-Luiana National Park
 Longa-Mavinga National Park

See also
 Wildlife of Zambia

References

External links
Official site

National parks of Zambia
National parks of Zimbabwe
National parks of Angola
National parks of Namibia
National parks of Botswana
Transboundary protected areas